Mukundapur  is a town in Gaidakot Municipality in the eastern part of Nawalparasi District in the Lumbini Zone of southern Nepal.

Mukundapur also refers to:
Mukundapur, Chanditala-I, a village in Chanditala I community development block of Srirampore subdivision in Hooghly District, West Bengal, India.
Mukundpur, a village in Amarpatan tehsil, Satna District, Madhya Pradesh State, India.
Mukundapur, Kolkata, a neighbourhood in Kolkata (formerly Calcutta) in Kolkata district , West Bengal, India.